Fever Fever (styled as Fever*Fever) is a 1999 album by PUFFY.

On tracks 4 and 10, "Nannari to Naru Deshou (Anything Can Become a Habit)" and "Always Dreamin' About You", the vocal parts are sung by Yumi Yoshimura and Ami Onuki solo, respectively. The latter is also sung entirely in English.

Track listing

Charts

Personnel 

Sumiharu Arima – French horn
Tomoyuki Asakawa – harp
Jake H. Concepcion – sax (tenor)
Otsuhiko Fujita – French horn
Takashi Furuta – drums
Takayuki Hijikata – guitar, electric guitar, handclapping
Makoto Hirahara – sax (alto)
Masato Inami – chorus
Megumi Ishibachi – French horn
Shin Kazuhara – trumpet
Taro Kiyooka – trombone
Chiharu Mikuzuki – bass
Akira Okazawa – bass
Tamio Okuda – chorus
Seigen Ono – engineer, mastering, mixing
Ami Onuki – vocals
Puffy AmiYumi – vocals, chorus, handclapping
Masanori Sasaji – keyboards
Masatsugu Shinozaki – strings
Andy Sturmer – producer, engineer, mixing
Shoko Suzuki – drums, chorus
Hideyo Takakuwa – flute
Yuichi Togashiki – drums
Minoru Uesato – sax (baritone)
Hiroshi Yaginuma – sax (tenor)
Tsuyoshi Yokoyama – programming
Yumi Yoshimura – vocals
Bob Zung – sax (tenor)

References

[ Allmusicguide listing for Fever*Fever]

Puffy AmiYumi albums
1999 albums